Grant Township may refer to:

Arkansas
 Grant Township, Johnson County, Arkansas, in Johnson County, Arkansas

Illinois
 Grant Township, Lake County, Illinois
 Grant Township, Vermilion County, Illinois

Indiana
 Grant Township, Benton County, Indiana
 Grant Township, DeKalb County, Indiana
 Grant Township, Greene County, Indiana
 Grant Township, Newton County, Indiana

Iowa
 Grant Township, Adams County, Iowa
 Grant Township, Boone County, Iowa
 Grant Township, Buena Vista County, Iowa
 Grant Township, Carroll County, Iowa
 Grant Township, Cass County, Iowa
 Grant Township, Cerro Gordo County, Iowa
 Grant Township, Clinton County, Iowa
 Grant Township, Dallas County, Iowa
 Grant Township, Franklin County, Iowa
 Grant Township, Greene County, Iowa
 Grant Township, Grundy County, Iowa
 Grant Township, Guthrie County, Iowa
 Grant Township, Hardin County, Iowa
 Grant Township, Ida County, Iowa
 Grant Township, Kossuth County, Iowa
 Grant Township, Linn County, Iowa
 Grant Township, Lyon County, Iowa
 Grant Township, Monona County, Iowa
 Grant Township, Montgomery County, Iowa
 Grant Township, O'Brien County, Iowa
 Grant Township, Page County, Iowa
 Grant Township, Plymouth County, Iowa
 Grant Township, Pocahontas County, Iowa
 Grant Township, Poweshiek County, Iowa
 Grant Township, Ringgold County, Iowa
 Grant Township, Sioux County, Iowa
 Grant Township, Story County, Iowa
 Grant Township, Tama County, Iowa
 Grant Township, Taylor County, Iowa
 Grant Township, Union County, Iowa, in Union County, Iowa
 Grant Township, Winnebago County, Iowa
 Grant Township, Woodbury County, Iowa
 Grant Township, Wright County, Iowa

Kansas
 Grant Township, Barton County, Kansas
 Grant Township, Clay County, Kansas
 Grant Township, Cloud County, Kansas
 Grant Township, Cowley County, Kansas
 Grant Township, Crawford County, Kansas
 Grant Township, Decatur County, Kansas
 Grant Township, Dickinson County, Kansas
 Grant Township, Douglas County, Kansas
 Grant Township, Jackson County, Kansas
 Grant Township, Jewell County, Kansas
 Grant Township, Lincoln County, Kansas, in Lincoln County, Kansas
 Grant Township, Marion County, Kansas
 Grant Township, Neosho County, Kansas
 Grant Township, Osage County, Kansas, in Osage County, Kansas
 Grant Township, Osborne County, Kansas, in Osborne County, Kansas
 Grant Township, Ottawa County, Kansas, in Ottawa County, Kansas
 Grant Township, Pawnee County, Kansas, in Pawnee County, Kansas
 Grant Township, Pottawatomie County, Kansas, in Pottawatomie County, Kansas
 Grant Township, Reno County, Kansas, in Reno County, Kansas
 Grant Township, Republic County, Kansas, in Republic County, Kansas
 Grant Township, Riley County, Kansas,  in Riley County, Kansas
 Grant Township, Russell County, Kansas
 Grant Township, Sedgwick County, Kansas
 Grant Township, Sherman County, Kansas
 Grant Township, Washington County, Kansas, in Washington County, Kansas

Michigan
 Grant Township, Cheboygan County, Michigan
 Grant Township, Clare County, Michigan
 Grant Township, Grand Traverse County, Michigan
 Grant Township, Huron County, Michigan
 Grant Township, Iosco County, Michigan
 Grant Township, Keweenaw County, Michigan
 Grant Township, Mason County, Michigan
 Grant Township, Mecosta County, Michigan
 Grant Township, Newaygo County, Michigan
 Grant Township, Oceana County, Michigan
 Grant Township, St. Clair County, Michigan

Missouri
 Grant Township, Caldwell County, Missouri
 Grant Township, Clark County, Missouri
 Grant Township, Dade County, Missouri
 Grant Township, Dallas County, Missouri
 Grant Township, DeKalb County, Missouri
 Grant Township, Harrison County, Missouri
 Grant Township, Nodaway County, Missouri
 Grant Township, Putnam County, Missouri, in Putnam County, Missouri
 Grant Township, Stone County, Missouri
 Grant Township, Webster County, Missouri

Nebraska
 Grant Township, Antelope County, Nebraska
 Grant Township, Buffalo County, Nebraska
 Grant Township, Cuming County, Nebraska
 Grant Township, Custer County, Nebraska
 Grant Township, Gage County, Nebraska
 Grant Township, Kearney County, Nebraska

North Carolina
 Grant Township, Randolph County, North Carolina, in Randolph County, North Carolina

North Dakota
 Grant Township, Richland County, North Dakota, in Richland County, North Dakota

Pennsylvania
 Grant Township, Indiana County, Pennsylvania

South Dakota
 Grant Township, Beadle County, South Dakota, in Beadle County, South Dakota
 Grant Township, Lincoln County, South Dakota, in Lincoln County, South Dakota
 Grant Township, McCook County, South Dakota, in McCook County, South Dakota
 Grant Township, Roberts County, South Dakota, in Roberts County, South Dakota

Township name disambiguation pages